The July 2018 Mogadishu bombings took place on July 7, 2018 when fighters of the Somali group Al-Shabaab attacked the compound of Somalia's interior and security ministries in the center of Mogadishu.                                                                          

At least 20 people were killed and two dozen others wounded and all three gunmen were killed by the security forces.

Attack 
The attack started when the terrorists detonated two car bombs outside the main gate of the interior ministry building before three militants stormed it.

References

2010s in Mogadishu
2018 in Somalia
2018 murders in Somalia
July 2018 bombings
21st-century mass murder in Somalia
July 2018 bombings
Attacks on buildings and structures in 2018
July 2018 bombings
Attacks on government buildings and structures
Islamic terrorist incidents in 2018
July 2018 crimes in Africa
July 2018 events in Africa
Mass murder in 2018
July 2018 bombings
Suicide bombings in 2018
July 2018
Suicide car and truck bombings in Somalia
Terrorist incidents in Somalia in 2018
Somali Civil War (2009–present)
Attacks on buildings and structures in Mogadishu